Frank Donck is a Belgian businessman. He is a member of the business club De Warande and director of KBC Group. He is a son of Jef Donck, who owned Comelco, which was sold to Campina.

Biography
He graduated from Ghent University as a licentiate in law and obtained a master in finance from the Vlerick Leuven Gent Management School. He worked for Investco (part of KBC Group) as an investment banker and is a member of the board of the KBC Group, Zenitel, Afinia Plastics, Telenet and Atenor. Frank Donck is also Managing Director of 3D and Ibervest (1987). In 2003, he was appointed Director of the KBC Bank and Insurance Holding Company.

References

 Frank Donck: Het Vlaamse anker van Telenet (Dutch)
 Frank Donck (Reuters)

Belgian businesspeople
Ghent University alumni
Living people
Vlerick Business School alumni
Year of birth missing (living people)